The Clacton Spear, or Clacton Spear Point, is the tip of a wooden spear discovered in Clacton-on-Sea in 1911.  It is 400,000 years old and the oldest known worked wooden implement.

Description
It is made of yew wood, shaped into a point, and when found was 387 mm long, 39 mm diameter and straight, but drying out during the first decades of storage shrank it to 367 mm by 37 mm, and warped it slightly into a curve.  Treatment by wax impregnation in 1952 apparently stabilized it.  At some time before this, the last 32 mm of the tip had broken off and had been re-attached by conservators.  This again came off in 2013 and was re-attached. It is on display at the Natural History Museum, London where its age is stated as 420,000 years.
Tests to reproduce it suggested that it had been formed by scraping with a curved flint tool of the type found on the same site, known as the Clactonian notch.

Discovery and significance
The discoverer was Samuel Hazzledine Warren, an amateur pre-historian, who had been looking for simple stone tools in a known Palaeolithic sediment.  He at first thought it to be an antler, but presented it to the Geological Society of London as a spear tip.  This identification was generally accepted for some time.  However, as it was not a whole spear and the great age meant that it was well before modern humans, many academics doubted that the amount of planning required (to manufacture a spear and use it for hunting) was within the cognitive capabilities of early hominids and argued it was a simpler tool such as a digging stick.  However, the discovery of several more complete spears about 300,000 years old, the Schöningen Spears in 1995 in Germany, demonstrated this capability, and the Clacton Spear is today generally regarded as a spear point.

References

Archaeological sites in England
Clacton-on-Sea
Spears
Paleolithic Europe
Individual wooden objects
Individual weapons